Laura Fritz (born 2 August 1978) is an Austrian handball player. She competed in the women's tournament at the 2000 Summer Olympics.

References

External links
 

1978 births
Living people
Austrian female handball players
Olympic handball players of Austria
Handball players at the 2000 Summer Olympics
Sportspeople from Graz